Events in the year 1986 in Turkey.

Parliament
17th Parliament of Turkey

Incumbents
President – Kenan Evren 
Prime Minister – Turgut Özal 
Leader of the opposition –
Aydın Güven Gürkan (up to 30 May)
Erdal İnönü (from 30 May)

Ruling party and the main opposition
 Ruling party – Motherland Party (ANAP) 
 Main opposition – Social Democratic Populist Party (SHP)

Cabinet
45th government of Turkey

Events

May 
 4 May – Nationalist Democracy Party (MDP) is dissolved.
 9 May – Free Democratic Party founded.
 16 May – True Path Party (DYP) forms parliamentary group.
 16 May – Eyüp Can wins bronze at the 1986 World Amateur Boxing Championships in Reno, United States
 30 May – Erdal Inönü elected chairman of Social Democratic Populist Party (SDPP).

June 
 1 June – Beşiktaş wins the championship

August 
 15 August – Turkey bombs separatist enclaves in Northern Iraq.

September 
 6 September – 22 die in the terror attack to the Neve Shalom Synagogue in Istanbul.

October 
 6 October – TRT 2, the second TV channel, starts airing. 
 24 October – Construction starts on Soviet natural gas pipeline.

November 
 12 November – Tanju Çolak wins European Golden Shoe.
 30 November – Free Democratic Party dissolves.

December 
 26 December – People’s Party established.
 29 December – People’s Party dissolves.

Births
9 February – Azize Tanrıkulu, taekwondo athlete
16 February – Nevin Yanıt, sprinter
22 February – Işıl Alben, basketball player
23 February – Serhat Çetin, basketball player
3 March – Mehmet Topal, footballer
4 June – Tolgahan Acar, footballer
25 June – Seda Tokatlıoğlu, volleyball player
16 September – Resul Tekeli, basketball player

Deaths
9 January – Nurullah Berk (born 1906), painter
10 January – Celal Yardımcı (born 1911), politician
7 May – Haldun Taner (born 1915), writer
28 May – Edip Cansever, (born 1928), poet
 22 August – Celal Bayar (born 1883), former president

Gallery

See also
Turkey in the Eurovision Song Contest 1986
 1985–86 1.Lig

References

 
Years of the 20th century in Turkey
Turkey
Turkey
Turkey